This list is of the Cultural Properties of Japan designated in the category of  for the Prefecture of Gunma.

National Cultural Properties
As of 1 May 2015, twenty one Important Cultural Properties (including one *National Treasure) with sixty component structures have been designated, being of national significance.

Prefectural Cultural Properties
As of 24 March 2015, fifty-three properties have been designated at a prefectural level.

Municipal Cultural Properties
As of 1 May 2014, three hundred and eleven properties have been designated at a municipal level.

Registered Cultural Properties
As of 1 May 2015, three hundred and sixteen properties at one hundred and seventeen sites have been registered (as opposed to designated) at a national level.

See also
 Cultural Properties of Japan
 National Treasures of Japan
 List of Historic Sites of Japan (Gunma)
 List of Cultural Properties of Japan - paintings (Gunma)

References

External links
  Cultural Properties in Gunma Prefecture

Cultural Properties,Gunma
Buildings and structures in Gunma Prefecture
Gunma
Structures,Gunma